"Memories of Us" is a song by American country singer George Jones.  The sad, nostalgic ballad was composed by Dave Kirby and Glenn Martin and became the title track of Jones' 1975 LP - his first after divorcing Tammy Wynette.  In the liner notes to the 1982 best of package Anniversary – 10 Years of Hits, producer Billy Sherrill singles the track out as one of his personal favorites but it failed to even crack the Top 20, peaking at #21.  The single marked the beginning of a commercial decline for Jones, who was about to fall headlong into an alcoholic and drug-fueled fog for most of the next decade; between 1975 and 1980, he would score only 2 Top 10 solo hits.

Chart performance

References

1975 singles
George Jones songs